Wyborn Reef Light is an active lighthouse located at Wyborn Reef, formerly known as Y Reef, about  southeast of Albany Island, east of the tip of Cape York Peninsula, Queensland, Australia. It marks the entrance to the Albany Passage. The lighthouse was constructed in 1938 and upgraded in 1991 and 1995. The structure is a stainless steel tower with a fiberglass hut within the framework, carrying a lantern.

History
The construction of an automatic lighthouse on Y Reef was approved by the Commonwealth Lighthouse Advisory Committee on 18 August 1937. This caused some confusion since a light was already present at the similarly named Wye Reef,  to the south. The light was eventually constructed by the Public Works Department in late 1938, in difficult conditions. The light was finally exhibited about 10 December of that year. It was automatic and unattended from its construction, and showed a group flashing white light characteristic.

The 1957 Admiralty List of Lights and Fog Signals lists an unmanned white light with a red sector, with a light characteristic of four flashes every twenty second (Fl.(4)W.R. 20s), identical to the current light characteristic. The intensity listed is 3,000 cd for the white light and 1,300 cd for the red one. The light was under the responsibility of the Commonwealth Lighthouse Service.

The light was converted to solar power in 1991 and upgraded in 1995. The remaining pilings from a previous lighthouse are still present next to the current one.

Structure and display
A white machinery fibreglass hut is located inside the tower framework. 

The lens inside the lantern room is a Chance Brothers 375 mm catadioptric Fresnel lens.

The current light characteristic is four flashes every twenty second, white with a red sector at 133°-143° (Fl.(4)W.R. 20s).
The light source is a solar powered 12 Volt 35 Watt Halogen lamp with an intensity of 3300 cd for the white light and 660 cd for the red one.

Site operation and visiting
The site and the tower are operated by the Australian Maritime Safety Authority. The island is accessible only by boat, and both the site and the tower are closed to the public.

See also

 List of lighthouses in Australia

References

External links

Dean Saffron Wyborn Reef Light short film and photographs, State Library of Queensland

Lighthouses completed in 1938
Lighthouses in Queensland
Torres Strait
1938 establishments in Australia